Leeyon Phelan (born 6 October 1982) is a former professional footballer who played in The Football League for Wycombe Wanderers.

References

English footballers
Wycombe Wanderers F.C. players
English Football League players
1982 births
Living people
Footballers from Hammersmith
Association football forwards